The Speed of Sound is a 1988 all-instrumental album by American rock guitarist Ronnie Montrose, who led the bands Montrose (1973-77 & 1987) and Gamma (1979-83 & 2000) and also performed and did session work with a variety of musicians, including Van Morrison (1971–72), Herbie Hancock (1971), Beaver & Krause (1971), Boz Scaggs (1971), Edgar Winter (1972 & 1996), Gary Wright (1975), The Beau Brummels (1975), Dan Hartman (1976), Tony Williams (1978), The Neville Brothers (1987), Marc Bonilla (1991 & 1993), Sammy Hagar (1997), and Johnny Winter. In 1997, Ronnie stated that this album was his favorite instrumental record he had done so far. The track titles are words and phrases referencing aviation themes.

In 1999, Ronnie Montrose himself re-released a limited edition of 500 compact discs that were each numbered and autographed and came with a certificate of authenticity through his own company RoMoCo. The CD had different artwork on the jewel case as well as the insert which was numbered as well.

Track listing

 "Mach 1" (Ronnie Montrose) – 4:27
 "Black Box" (Montrose) – 4:40
 "Hyper-Thrust" (Montrose) – 3:25
 "Monolith" (Montrose) – 3:15
 "Zero G" (Montrose) – 4:18
 "Telstar" (Joe Meek / The Tornados cover) – 3:11
 "Sidewinder" (Montrose) – 3:54
 "Windshear" (Montrose) – 4:16
 "VTOL" (Montrose) – 3:05
 "Outer Marker Inbound" (Montrose) – 4:34

Personnel

 Ronnie Montrose – guitar, percussion, MIDI guitar synthesizer
 Glenn Letsch – bass guitar
 Johnny Badanjek – drums
 Patrick Feehan – synthesizer on "Zero G" and "Outer Marker Inbound"

Production

 Produced by Ronnie Montrose
 Engineered by Ronnie Montrose and Roger Wiersema

References

 Ronnie Montrose; The Speed of Sound liner notes; Enigma Records 1988
 All Music Guide []

1988 albums
Ronnie Montrose albums
Enigma Records albums